Jawahar Navodaya Vidyalaya, North Goa or locally known as JNV Valpoi is a boarding, co-educational  school in North Goa district of Goa state in India. Navodaya Vidyalayas are funded by the Indian Ministry of Human Resources Development and administered  by Navodaya Vidyalaya Smiti, an autonomous body under the ministry.

History 
The school was established in 1988, and is a part of Jawahar Navodaya Vidyalaya schools which provide free education to gifted children. The school shifted to its permanent campus on 10 February 2002. This school is administered and monitored by Pune regional office of Navodaya Vidyalaya Smiti.

Admission 
Admission to JNV North Goa at class VI level is made through selection test conducted by Navodaya Vidyalaya Smiti. The information about test is disseminated and advertised in North Goa district by the office of North Goa district magistrate (Collector), who is also chairperson of Vidyalya Management Committee.

Affiliations 
JNV North Goa is affiliated to Central Board of Secondary Education with affiliation number 2840002.

See also 
 Jawahar Navodaya Vidyalaya, South Goa
 List of JNV schools

References

External links 

 Official Website of JNV North Goa

Education in North Goa district
Jawahar Navodaya Vidyalayas in Goa
Educational institutions established in 1988
1988 establishments in Goa

Boarding schools in Goa
High schools and secondary schools in Goa